Admiral Sir Josias Rowley, 1st Baronet,  (1765 – 10 January 1842), known as "The Sweeper of the Seas", was an Anglo-Irish naval officer who commanded the campaign that captured the French Indian Ocean islands of Réunion and Mauritius in 1810.

Birth and family
Rowley was born in 1765 the second son of Clotworthy Rowley and Letitia (née Campbell), of Mountcampbell, Drumsna, County Leitrim, in the West of Ireland. His father was a Barrister and MP for Downpatrick in the Irish Parliament. His paternal grandfather was Admiral of the Fleet Sir William Rowley, KCB. He had at least one brother William, MP for Kinsale and Recorder of Kinsale.

Naval career
He joined the Royal Navy in 1778, age 13, on HMS Suffolk in the West Indies, under the command of his uncle, Sir Joshua Rowley.

Promoted to post captain in 1795, age 30, he commanded HMS Braave (40 guns) at the Cape of Good Hope and then  (38 guns) in the East Indies. He also commanded  (64 guns) and took part in the Battle of Cape Finisterre in 1805. In 1798 he became the Member of the Irish House of Commons for Downpatrick.

In 1808 he became commander-in-chief, Cape of Good Hope Station. In 1809, as commodore of a small squadron off Mauritius, working with the commander of the East India Company troops at Rodrigues, he successfully raided the island of Réunion.

In March 1810 he moved into  (38 guns) and transported a larger landing party to Réunion and captured the island. Meanwhile, a force led by Captain Samuel Pym RN was being out-flanked by French frigates attacking Grand Port, Mauritius. HMS Africaine was captured by the French frigates Iphigénie and Astrée in the engagement. Rowley then re-captured Africaine the same day. Vice-Admiral Albemarle Bertie arrived on 29 November and took the surrender of Mauritius on 3 December 1810.

He was created a baronet in December 1813, promoted rear-admiral in 1814 and appointed KCB in 1815.

In the summer of 1815, age 50, with his flagship Impregnable (98 guns), under Lord Exmouth he sailed once more to the Mediterranean. In 1818 he was appointed commander-in-chief on the Cork Station. In 1821 he became MP for Kinsale, County Cork. Promoted to vice-admiral in 1825, he was made commander-in-chief, Mediterranean Fleet in 1833.

Death at home
He died on 10 January 1842, about age 76, in the Mount Campbell family estate at Drumsna in County Leitrim. He was buried and commemorated at the nearby Annaduff Parish Church. He was unmarried, without heir to his titles. He was survived by his younger brothers Vice Admiral Samuel Rowley (also commemorated within Annaduff Parish Church) and The Reverend John Rowley, incumbent rector at Virginia in County Cavan. The eldest brother William, Recorder of  Kinsale, had died in 1812.

In literature

The 1809-1810 campaign was used by author Patrick O'Brian as the setting for the fourth in the series of Aubrey–Maturin series books, The Mauritius Command. The fictional Captain Jack Aubrey takes the place of Rowley in the novel.

See also

References

Bibliography

Josias Rowley's service record and Last Will and Testament are held in the British National Archives

External links 
 

|-

|-

|-

|-

1765 births
1842 deaths
People from County Armagh
People from County Leitrim
Irish sailors in the Royal Navy
19th-century Irish people
Baronets in the Baronetage of the United Kingdom
Royal Navy personnel of the French Revolutionary Wars
British naval commanders of the Napoleonic Wars
High Sheriffs of Suffolk
History of Mauritius
Irish MPs 1798–1800
Knights Grand Cross of the Order of St Michael and St George
Knights Grand Cross of the Order of the Bath
Knights Cross of the Military Order of Maria Theresa
Royal Navy admirals
UK MPs 1820–1826
British Mauritius
Members of the Parliament of Ireland (pre-1801) for County Down constituencies
Members of the Parliament of the United Kingdom for County Cork constituencies (1801–1922)